Modern warfare generally refers to contemporary warfare as contrasted with previous methods.

Aspects of modern warfare:
Early modern warfare
18th-century warfare
Napoleonic Wars
Industrial warfare
Mechanized warfare
Total war
Fourth-generation warfare

Modern Warfare as a proper noun:
Modern warfare, book of Roger Trinquier written in 1961.
Modern Warfare (band), punk rock band from Long Beach, California
"Modern Warfare" (Community), episode of the television series Communitny
Several video games named modern warfare in the Call of Duty series of first-person shooters:
Call of Duty 4: Modern Warfare, released 2007
Call of Duty 4: Modern Warfare (Nintendo DS), first-person shooter companion of above game for the Nintendo DS
Call of Duty: Modern Warfare 2, 2009 sequel to Call of Duty 4
Call of Duty: Modern Warfare – Mobilized, a first-person shooter companion of above game for the Nintendo DS
Call of Duty: Modern Warfare 3, 2011 sequel to Modern Warfare 2
Call of Duty: Modern Warfare, released in October 2019
Call of Duty: Modern Warfare II, released 2022.

See also
Military history